Mohamed Chande Othman (born 1 January 1952) is a Tanzanian lawyer and a former Chief Justice of Tanzania.

Internationally he is highly respected for his deep understanding of political, legal and other dimensions relating to International Humanitarian Law, Refugee Law, Criminal Law and Evidence, and Peacekeeping. He held various positions as expert advisor and UN prosecutor at criminal tribunals such as the UNDP Cambodia, the East Timor (UNTAET), the International Criminal Tribunal for Rwanda (ICTR), UN Human Rights Council for a) the Israel-Lebanon Armed Conflict and b) the Southern Sudan.

Currently he is head of the UN Independent Panel of Experts that examine new information on Dag Hammarskjölds death.

Education 

 LL.B (Hon), University of Dar es Salaam, 1974
 M.A (International Relations) Webster University, Geneva, Switzerland, 1982
 Certificate, The Hague Academy of International Law, the Netherlands, 1983

Biography

United Nations High Level positions 

 Head of the UN Independent Panel of Experts, charged with the assessment and examination of new information relating to the tragic death of the former UN Secretary-General Dag Hammarskjöld (since Mar. 2015)
 UN Human Rights Council's: Member of the High-Level Commission of Inquiry into the Situation in Lebanon following the Israel-Lebanon Armed Conflict (2006)
 UN Human Rights Council's: Independent Expert on the human rights situation in the Sudan (2009–2010). He visits Southern Sudan and the Abyei area.
 Prosecutor general of East Timor (UNTAET) (Jun-1999 – Jul-2002)
 Chief of Prosecutions of the International Criminal Tribunal for Rwanda (ICTR) (1998–2000)

Tanzania Justice Department positions 

 Chief Justice of Tanzania (Dec. 2010 – Jan. 2017 ) 
 High Court Judge (Dec. 2003 – Oct. 2004) 
 Appeal Court Judge (Aug. 2004 – Feb. 2008)

Other Legal and Professional experience 

 Member of the board of trustees of the Aga Khan University (since 2017)
 Expert advisor for the Africa Group for Justice and Accountability – Wayamo Foundation.
 Senior Legal and Justice Reform Advisor for UNDP Cambodia
 Chairman of the Presidential Commission on Inquiry on the Relocation of Pastoralists and their Livestock from Usanga Valley in Ihefu, Mbarali District, Tanzania
 Public Prosecutor for the Bank of Tanzania
 Working with the International Federation of the Red Cross and Red Crescent Societies
 Co-founder of the Sidéco Group Ltd., International Development and Trade Corporation in Geneva (1983)

Publications 

 Accountability for International Humanitarian law Violations: The Case of Rwanda and East Timor, Springer Publishers, Heidelberg, Germany, 2005
 'The Framework of Prosecutions and the Court System in East Timor''' in New Approaches in International Criminal Justice, Freiburg im Breisgau, Germany, 2003
 "Defense Practices and the Khmer Rouge Tribunal", in Bohlander, M, Boed, R, Wilsn, R.J, (Eds.) Defense in International Criminal Proceedings, Transitional Publishers Inc., N.Y, 2006
 The Protection of Refugee Witnesses by the International Criminal Tribunal for Rwanda, International Journal of Refugee Law, Volume 14, No. 4, May 2003
 The Gulf Wars and Termination of Captivity for Prisoners of War'', Revue de Droit International des Sciences Diplomatiques et Politiques (The International Law Review) Jan-Mars 1993, 11–36, Geneva, 1993

See also
 Chief Justice of Tanzania

References

1952 births
Chief justices of Tanzania
University of Dar es Salaam alumni
Webster University alumni
Living people